Austin Post may refer to:

 Austin Post (photographer) (1922–2012)
 Post Malone (Austin Richard Post, born 1995)